is a passenger railway station in the city of Sakura, Chiba Prefecture, Japan, operated by the private railway operator Keisei Electric Railway.

Lines
Keisei-Sakura Station is served by the Keisei Main Line, and lies 51.0 kilometers from the Tokyo terminus of the line at Keisei-Ueno Station.

Station layout
The station consists of two island platforms connected to an elevated station building.

Platforms

History
Keisei-Sakura Station was opened on 9 December 1926, slightly to the south of its present location. The station was rebuilt in its present location in 1962.

Station numbering was introduced to all Keisei Line stations on 17 July 2010. Keisei-Sakura Station was assigned station number KS35.

Passenger statistics
In fiscal 2019, the station was used by an average of 18,305 passengers daily.

Surrounding area
 Sakura City Hall
 Chiba Inba Government Building

See also
 List of railway stations in Japan

References

External links

 Keisei Station layout

Railway stations in Japan opened in 1926
Railway stations in Chiba Prefecture
Keisei Main Line
Sakura, Chiba